Phyllobrotica is a genus of skeletonizing leaf beetles and flea beetles in the family Chrysomelidae. There are at least 18 described species in Phyllobrotica.

Species
 Phyllobrotica antennata Schaeffer, 1932
 Phyllobrotica blakeae Hatch, 1971
 Phyllobrotica circumdata (Say, 1824)
 Phyllobrotica costipennis Horn, 1893
 Phyllobrotica decorata (Say, 1824)
 Phyllobrotica leechi Blake, 1956
 Phyllobrotica lengi Blatchley, 1910
 Phyllobrotica limbata (Fabricius, 1801)
 Phyllobrotica luperina J. L. LeConte, 1865
 Phyllobrotica nigripes Horn, 1893
 Phyllobrotica nigritarsi Linell, 1898
 Phyllobrotica nigritarsis Linell, 1897
 Phyllobrotica physostegiae E. Riley, 1979
 Phyllobrotica sequoiensis Blake, 1956
 Phyllobrotica sororia Horn, 1896
 Phyllobrotica stenidea Schaeffer, 1932
 Phyllobrotica viridipennis (J. L. LeConte, 1859)
 Phyllobrotica vittata Horn, 1893

References

 Riley, Edward G., Shawn M. Clark, and Terry N. Seeno (2003). "Catalog of the leaf beetles of America north of Mexico (Coleoptera: Megalopodidae, Orsodacnidae and Chrysomelidae, excluding Bruchinae)". Coleopterists Society Special Publication no. 1, 290.

Further reading

 Arnett, R. H. Jr., M. C. Thomas, P. E. Skelley and J. H. Frank. (eds.). (21 June 2002). American Beetles, Volume II: Polyphaga: Scarabaeoidea through Curculionoidea. CRC Press LLC, Boca Raton, Florida .
 Arnett, Ross H. (2000). American Insects: A Handbook of the Insects of America North of Mexico. CRC Press.
 Richard E. White. (1983). Peterson Field Guides: Beetles. Houghton Mifflin Company.

External links

 NCBI Taxonomy Browser, Phyllobrotica

Galerucinae
Chrysomelidae genera
Taxa named by Louis Alexandre Auguste Chevrolat